Teray Smith (born 28 September 1994) is a Bahamian sprinter.

He attended American Heritage School in Plantation, Florida, for his junior and senior year, after transferring from Everglades High School in Miramar.

Smith won a bronze medal in the 100 metres at the 2012 CARIFTA Games in Hamilton, Bermuda & a gold medal at the 2013 CARIFTA Games in Nassau, Bahamas.

Smith is the nephew of Henry Rolle. Rolle recruited Smith to Auburn University before going on to professionally coach him as part of the MVP International in Boca Raton, Florida.

Competition record

1Did not start in the final

References

External links

Auburn Bio

1994 births
Living people
Bahamian male sprinters
Athletes (track and field) at the 2014 Commonwealth Games
Athletes (track and field) at the 2018 Commonwealth Games
Athletes (track and field) at the 2015 Pan American Games
Pan American Games competitors for the Bahamas
World Athletics Championships athletes for the Bahamas
People from Freeport, Bahamas
Athletes (track and field) at the 2016 Summer Olympics
Olympic athletes of the Bahamas
Commonwealth Games medallists in athletics
Commonwealth Games silver medallists for the Bahamas
Medallists at the 2018 Commonwealth Games